A toy balloon or party balloon, is a small balloon mostly used for decoration, advertising and children's toys. Toy balloons are usually made of rubber or aluminized plastic, and inflated with air or helium.  They come in a great variety of sizes and shapes, but are most commonly 10 to 30 centimetres in diameter. Toy balloons are not considered to include "sky lanterns" (hot-air paper balloons), although these too are or were used as child toys in some parts of the world.

According to The Journal of the American Medical Association, out of  373 children who died in the US between 1972 and 1992 after choking on children's products, nearly a third choked on latex balloons. The Consumer Products Safety Commission found that children had inhaled latex balloons whole (often while trying to inflate them) or choked on fragments of broken balloons. Parents, a monthly magazine about raising children, advised parents to buy Mylar balloons instead of latex balloons.

History

Early balloons were made from pig bladders and animal intestines. The Aztecs created the first balloon sculptures using wildcat intestines, which were then presented to the gods as a sacrifice. There are references to balloons made of whale intestine in Swiss Family Robinson (1813) and in Moby Dick (1851).

The first rubber balloons were made by Professor Michael Faraday in 1824 for use in his experiments with hydrogen at the Royal Institution in London. "The caoutchouc is exceedingly elastic," he wrote in the Quarterly Journal of Science the same year. "Bags made of it...have been expanded by having air forced into them, until the caoutchouc was quite transparent, and when expanded by hydrogen they were so light as to form balloons with considerable ascending power...." Faraday made his balloons by cutting round two sheets of rubber laid together and pressing the edges together. The tacky rubber welded automatically, and the inside of the balloon was rubbed with flour to prevent the opposing surfaces joining together.

Latex rubber toy balloons were introduced by pioneer rubber manufacturer Thomas Hancock the following year in the form of a do-it-yourself kit consisting of a bottle of rubber solution and a condensing syringe. Vulcanized toy balloons, which unlike the earlier kind were unaffected by changes in temperature, were first manufactured by J.G. Ingram of London in 1847 and can be regarded as the prototype of modern toy balloons.

Since the 1890s, paper balloons called kamifūsen have been popular children's toys in Japan.

In the 1920s Neil Tillotson designed and produced a latex balloon with a cat's face and ears from a cardboard form which he cut by hand with a pair of scissors. He managed to make his first sale of these balloons with an order of 15 gross to be delivered for the annual Patriots' Day Parade on April 19, 1931. The first colored balloons were sold at the 1933-34 Chicago World's Fair.

Foil balloons

Inflatable foil balloons are made from plastics, such as biaxially-oriented PET film. Foil balloons are not elastic like rubber balloons, so that detailed and colorful pictures printed on their surfaces are not distorted when the balloon is inflated.  Foil balloons are thus named because they sometimes have a metallic coating to make them shiny; however, there have been concerns about metallic balloons causing short circuits when caught in overhead power lines. Because metallic balloons can cause power outages like on overhead catenary train lines, it is recommended that the metallic balloons not only be tied by a string or ribbon with no metal in it, but also securely tied down by a weight to prevent the balloon from floating away and some train operators either issue advisories on how to handle balloons or ban balloons altogether. When no longer required, it is recommended to cut the balloon to release the helium and dispose of in a garbage container.

Filling

Every toy balloon has an opening (or mouth) through which gases are blown into it, followed by a connecting tube known as the neck.  Balloons are usually filled by using one's breath, a pump, or a pressurized gas tank.  The opening can then be permanently tied off or clamped temporarily.  Foil balloons are typically self-sealing.  By filling a balloon with a gas lighter than air, such as helium, the balloon can be made to float.  Helium is the preferred gas for floating balloons, because it is inert and will not catch fire (like hydrogen) or cause toxic effects when inhaled.  Small, light objects (postcards, in balloon mail for example) are sometimes placed in balloons along with helium and released into the air and, when the balloon eventually falls, the object inside might be found by another person.  Rubber balloons can also be filled with liquids (usually water) and can burst when they impact a solid object.  Liquid-filled balloons are commonly referred to as water balloons or water bombs and used in playful fights, and sometimes vandalism.

Balloon shapes
Most toy balloons are a simple oval-like shape.  But balloon suppliers also offers other shapes for toy balloons.  Some examples of other shapes are:  "zeppelins" or "airships," where balloons are usually longer than wide; "espirals" or "rattlesnakes," similar to zeppelins, but much longer (not to be confused with balloons for twisting); "hearts," balloons with the shape of a heart; "dolls," two round shapes joined that represent a head and a body; "mouseheads," composed of three round parts, one for the head and two for the ears; "bunnyheads," similar to mouseheads but with long ears; "bunny balloons," which resemble a stuffed toy bunny, having a big long shape for the body, a smaller shape for the head, and two long shapes for the ears; "elephants," with two shapes for the body and the head, and a very long shape for the trunk; and "ducks," with a big shape for the body, a smaller round shape for the head and smaller shape for the beak.  There are many other possible shapes, depending on the manufacturers.

Balloon modeling

There are balloons that are longer and more cylindrical. These long balloons are often twisted and bent into simple, or intricate shapes which will hold their form when released. Balloon artists are people who quickly twist balloons into familiar or abstract shapes using the techniques of balloon modelling, usually for profit. Other names for balloon modeling include: balloon twisting, balloon bending, or simply twisting.

Artists who practice balloon modeling are called: Balloon Twisters, Balloon Benders, Balloon Modeler and even have been referred to as a Latex Vessel Reconstruction Engineer.

The types of balloons used for this practice are pencil balloons and are called 160s, 260s, 350s, 360s, 660s or 646s. These number designations refer to the sizes of the balloons and roughly equate to the diameter and the length of the balloon when fully inflated. The 260, one of the most common animal balloon sizes, would be 2 inches in diameter and then 60 inches long when fully inflated.

The modeling balloons can be made into simple dogs, hearts, and swords or can be made into more intricate shapes such as dragons, cartoon characters, or even figments of the imagination. More and more, nearly anything is becoming possible with balloon twisting and it shows at major industry conventions such as Twist and Shout, the largest balloon twisting convention in the world.

Noises

Toy balloons are often characterized by their distinctive noises if manipulated in some ways. These noises include:
 Popping: The loud noise of an inflated balloon when it bursts. When a balloon bursts, the torn parts of the rubber suddenly contract with sufficient force to exceed the speed of sound and form a small sonic boom. It happens simultaneously as a sudden air pressure change from the inside, causing a rapid shockwave that creates the sharp, loud popping sound. Globophobia is an uncommon phobia (fear) associated with the popping noise produced by balloons.
 Squeaking: It is done by inflating the balloon, then slowly release the air by stretching the neck or the mouth sideways. The stretched part creates a very tight and tiny gap for air to flow, then the air pressure causes the opening to oscillate and vibrate, creating a loud high-pitched squeaking or screeching noise. The sound can be changed by adjusting the tension of the stretching. This is the same way as how vocal cords and reed instruments work. Rocket balloons, however, could create this noise by simply deflating, due to the tighter neck.
 "Raspberry" sound: It is done by simply releasing an inflated balloon and letting it deflate. The escaping air pressure creates a turbulence that causes the flexible opening to flap back and forth rapidly, creating a deep, long "flatulence"-like noise. The balloon will also be propelled away because of the Newton's third law of motion, a phenomenon commonly known as balloon rocket. This can also be done by pinching the balloon's neck, then slowly opening the mouth without letting it loose. The open end vibrates instead of flapping, creating a similar, yet higher pitched noise.
 Scratching: It is done by simply rubbing a hand against the balloon itself, providing the balloon is fully inflated, creating an elastic surface.
 Thrumming: Hold the balloon by the opening valve (usually while it is knotted closed) and shake it. The balloon bounces and stretches, creating another distinctive sound.

Uses

Toy balloons are used as decorations and/or advertising space.  Balloons are usually purchased in deflated form, however, some party stores and vendors at special events will fill their balloons before selling them, this is called "balloon stuffing" where the balloons are filled with objects such as smaller balloons, teddy bears, etc.

While toy balloons are primarily a toy, they are also sometimes used for demonstrations and experiments in classrooms. During the 19th century, it was thought that rubber balloons could be used to replace certain organs, but this was quickly disproved.

Toy balloons can be filled with water and used in a variety of ways, usually for fun. They can be thrown, or set up to drop on the head of an unsuspecting victim. Some Australians report using water balloons around their house during bushfires, as the heat of the flames breaks the balloon and causes the water to land on the fire.

There are water balloons which are balloons specifically designed to be filled with water.

See also
 Balloon modelling (balloon animal)
 Balloon release
 Balloon rocket
 List of inflatable manufactured goods

References

 
 

Balloons (entertainment)
Traditional toys
Rubber toys
Inflatable manufactured goods
Helium